Maoriharpalus sutherlandi is a species of beetle in the family Carabidae, the only species in the genus Maoriharpalus.

References

Harpalinae
Beetles of New Zealand
Endemic fauna of New Zealand
Endemic insects of New Zealand